Maa Voori Magadu is a 1987 Indian Telugu action drama film starring Krishna Ghattamaneni, Sridevi and Kaikala Satyanarayana in the lead roles alongside an ensemble supporting cast which includes Gollapudi Maruti Rao, Nutan Prasad, Suttivelu and Kota Srinivasa Rao. Scripted by Paruchuri Brothers, directed by K. Bapayya and produced by T. Srinivasa Reddy for Sri Vinay Art Pictures, the film had musical score by Chakravarthy. Released on 30 October 1987, the film is an average fare at the box office.

Cast 
 Krishna Ghattamaneni as Ravi
 Sridevi as Rajini
 Satyanarayana Kaikala
 Nutan Prasad
 Gollapudi Maruti Rao
 Suttivelu
 Ramakrishna (Telugu actor)
 Sutti Veerabhadra Rao
 Kota Srinivasa Rao
 Chalapathi Rao
 Narra Venkateswara Rao
 Balaji
 Ravi Kondala Rao
 Sakshi Ranga Rao
 Jayanthi
 Aruna Srilakshmi
 Jaya Bhaskar
 Chidathala Appa Rao

Music 
The film's soundtrack album comprising 5 tracks was scored and composed by Chakravarthy and lyrics penned by Veturi Sundararama Murthy.
 "Sunnam Pettuko" — P. Susheela, Raj Seetharam
 "Yadagiri Guttakada" — P. Susheela, Raj Seetharam
 "Aa Malla Mogga" — P. Susheela, Raj Seetharam
 "Siggenduke" — P. Susheela, Raj Seetharam
 "Thank O Thank" — P. Susheela, Raj Seetharam

References 

1987 films
1987 action films
1980s Telugu-language films
Indian action films
Films directed by K. Bapayya
Films scored by K. Chakravarthy